Whinnyfold or Whinneyfold is a small coastal village at the southern end of the Bay of Cruden in Aberdeenshire, Scotland.

Whinnyfold (locally pronounced finnyfa) is a clifftop hamlet of fisher cottages built in the 1860s, replacing an older settlement one mile inland.  Whinnyfold has no harbour, and fisherfolk had to scramble up and down a steep grass slope to access their boats and catches.  Nevertheless, in the nineteenth century and the first decades of the twentieth century it was a thriving fishing community, supporting as many as 190 fishermen operating 24 boats and exporting fish as far afield  as Manchester.

During the herring boom the fishers abandoned the village for the summer season, seeking more lucrative employment in Peterhead. Enterprisingly, those left behind temporarily converted a few of the cottages into a series of tearooms serving the moneyed holidaymakers visiting Cruden Bay. Among the visitors was Bram Stoker, author of Dracula.

Near the village, just off the south end of the Cruden sands, lies the treacherous area of semi-submerged rocks known as the Skares, the site of many shipwrecks and source of local lore, and inspiration to Stoker's novel The Mystery of the Sea.

Mechanisation of fishing and ever larger vessels, plus the impracticality of the site and the loss of rail links to key markets, put an end to commercial fishing at Whinnyfold. Today the village remains small and without amenities, served for local shops, school, medical practice and even public telephone by nearby Cruden Bay.

The Colliston to Whinnyfold Coast is designated as a Site of Special Scientific Interest for nationally important colonies of cliff nesting seabirds, including kittiwake, guillemot, razorbill, fulmar and shag. It forms part of the Buchan Ness to Collieston Coast Special Protection Area.

References

External links

Villages in Aberdeenshire